Beverly Drive-In Theatre was constructed in 1948 as a cinema structure in Forrest County, Mississippi. The main screen measured , and the theatre contained a paved parking area for 500 cars.  The back of the screen tower held a display of neon lights that denoted the Beverly logo with a moon and shooting stars. The original owners built their family home beneath the main screen.

In 2007, the Mississippi Heritage Trust listed the Beverly Drive-In as one of the ten most endangered historic places in Mississippi.  The theatre was listed on the National Register of Historic Places on July 30, 2008.

The theatre operated from 1948 through 1987, and periodically for special events, into 2005, when Hurricane Katrina caused significant damage to the screen and buildings. In 2005, it was the oldest drive-in theatre still operating in Mississippi.

The Beverly Drive-In Theatre burned to the ground on October 30, 2010.

See also
 List of drive-in theaters

References

Buildings and structures in Hattiesburg, Mississippi
Theatres on the National Register of Historic Places in Mississippi
Former cinemas in the United States
Cinemas and movie theaters in Mississippi
Burned buildings and structures in the United States
Drive-in theaters in the United States
National Register of Historic Places in Forrest County, Mississippi